The genus Ixora is one of the largest genera of flowering plants and contains around 562 species from the family Rubiaceae. Detailed, up to date information can be found on the World Checklist of Rubiaceae.

A 

Ixora accedens 
Ixora aciculiflora 
Ixora acuminatissima 
Ixora acuticauda 
Ixora aegialodes 
Ixora agasthyamalayana 
Ixora aggregata 
Ixora agostiniana 
Ixora akkeringae 
Ixora alba 
Ixora albersii 
Ixora alejandroi 
Ixora aluminicola 
Ixora amapaensis 
Ixora amherstiensis 
Ixora amplexicaulis 
Ixora amplexifolia 
Ixora amplifolia 
Ixora andamanensis 
Ixora aneimenodesma 
Ixora aneityensis 
Ixora angustilimba 
Ixora aoupinieensis 
Ixora araguaiensis 
Ixora archboldii 
Ixora arestantha 
Ixora asme 
Ixora athroantha 
Ixora auricularis 
Ixora auriculata 
Ixora aurorea

B 

Ixora backeri 
Ixora bahiensis 
Ixora baileyana 
Ixora balakrishnii 
Ixora balansae 
Ixora baldwinii 
Ixora balinensis 
Ixora bancana 
Ixora banjoana 
Ixora barbata 
Ixora barberae 
Ixora bartlingii 
Ixora batesii 
Ixora batuensis 
Ixora bauchiensis 
Ixora beckleri 
Ixora beddomei 
Ixora bemangidiensis 
Ixora betongensis 
Ixora bibracteata 
Ixora biflora 
Ixora birmahica 
Ixora blumei 
Ixora borboniae 
Ixora borneensis 
Ixora bougainvilliae 
Ixora brachiata 
Ixora brachyantha 
Ixora brachyanthera 
Ixora brachycotyla 
Ixora brachypoda 
Ixora brachypogon 
Ixora brachyura 
Ixora bracteolaris 
Ixora bracteolata 
Ixora brandisiana 
Ixora brassii 
Ixora brevicaudata 
Ixora brevifolia 
Ixora breviloba 
Ixora brevipedunculata 
Ixora brunnescens 
Ixora brunonis 
Ixora bullata 
Ixora burundiensis 
Ixora butterwickii 
Ixora buxina

C 

Ixora cabraliensis 
Ixora calcicola 
Ixora calliantha 
Ixora callithyrsa 
Ixora calycina 
Ixora cambodiana 
Ixora capillaris 
Ixora capitulifera 
Ixora capituliflora 
Ixora carewii 
Ixora casei 
Ixora caudata 
Ixora cauliflora 
Ixora celebica 
Ixora cephalophora 
Ixora ceramensis 
Ixora chakrabortyi 
Ixora chartacea 
Ixora chinensis 
Ixora cibdela 
Ixora cincta 
Ixora clandestina 
Ixora clarae 
Ixora clementium 
Ixora clerodendron 
Ixora coccinea 
Ixora coffeoides 
Ixora collina 
Ixora comptonii 
Ixora concinna 
Ixora conferta 
Ixora confertiflora 
Ixora confertior 
Ixora congesta 
Ixora congestiflora 
Ixora coralloraphis 
Ixora cordata 
Ixora cordifolia 
Ixora coriifolia 
Ixora coronata 
Ixora cowanii 
Ixora crassifolia 
Ixora crassipes 
Ixora cremixora 
Ixora cumingiana 
Ixora cuneata 
Ixora cuneifolia 
Ixora curtisii 
Ixora cuspidata

D 

Ixora daemonia 
Ixora davisii 
Ixora decaryi 
Ixora deciduiflora 
Ixora decus-silvae 
Ixora delicatula 
Ixora deliensis 
Ixora delpyana 
Ixora densiflora 
Ixora densithyrsa 
Ixora diversifolia 
Ixora djambica 
Ixora dolichophylla 
Ixora dolichothyrsa 
Ixora dongnaiensis 
Ixora doreensis 
Ixora dorgelonis 
Ixora duckei 
Ixora dzumacensis

E 

Ixora ebracteolata 
Ixora effusa 
Ixora elegans 
Ixora elisae 
Ixora elongata 
Ixora eludens 
Ixora emirnensis 
Ixora emygdioi 
Ixora endertii 
Ixora engganensis 
Ixora ensifolia 
Ixora eriantha 
Ixora erythrocarpa 
Ixora eugenioides 
Ixora euosmia

F 

Ixora fallax 
Ixora farinosa 
Ixora faroensis 
Ixora fastigiata 
Ixora ferrea 
Ixora filiflora 
Ixora filipendula 
Ixora filipes 
Ixora filmeri 
Ixora finlaysoniana 
Ixora flagrans 
Ixora flavescens 
Ixora floribunda 
Ixora florida 
Ixora foetida 
Ixora foliicalyx 
Ixora foliosa 
Ixora forbesii 
Ixora fragrans 
Ixora francavillana 
Ixora francii 
Ixora fucosa 
Ixora fugiens 
Ixora fulgida 
Ixora fulviflora 
Ixora funckii 
Ixora fusca 
Ixora fuscescens 
Ixora fuscovenosa

G 

Ixora gamblei 
Ixora gardneriana 
Ixora gautieri 
Ixora gibbsiae 
Ixora gigantea 
Ixora gigantifolia 
Ixora glaucina 
Ixora glomeruliflora 
Ixora goalparensis 
Ixora graciliflora 
Ixora grandifolia 
Ixora granulata 
Ixora grazielae 
Ixora greenwoodiana 
Ixora guillotii 
Ixora guineensis 
Ixora guluensis 
Ixora gyropogon

H 

Ixora hainanensis 
Ixora hajupensis 
Ixora hallieri 
Ixora hartiana 
Ixora harveyi 
Ixora havilandii 
Ixora hekouensis 
Ixora helwigii 
Ixora henryi 
Ixora heterodoxa 
Ixora hiernii 
Ixora himantophylla 
Ixora hippoperifera 
Ixora homolleae 
Ixora hookeri 
Ixora hymenophylla

I 

Ixora ilocana 
Ixora imitans 
Ixora inaequifolia 
Ixora inexpecta 
Ixora inodora 
Ixora insignis 
Ixora insularum 
Ixora intensa 
Ixora intermedia 
Ixora intropilosa 
Ixora inundata 
Ixora irosinensis 
Ixora irwinii 
Ixora iteaphylla 
Ixora iteoidea 
Ixora ixoroides

J 

Ixora jacobsonii 
Ixora jaherii 
Ixora javanica 
Ixora johnsonii 
Ixora jourdanii 
Ixora jucunda 
Ixora junghuhnii

K 

Ixora kachinensis 
Ixora kaniensis 
Ixora karimatica 
Ixora katchalensis 
Ixora kavalliana 
Ixora keenanii 
Ixora keithii 
Ixora kerrii 
Ixora kerstingii 
Ixora keyensis 
Ixora killipii 
Ixora kinabaluensis 
Ixora kingdon-wardii 
Ixora kingstoni 
Ixora kjellbergii 
Ixora knappiae 
Ixora koordersii 
Ixora korthalsiana 
Ixora krewanhensis 
Ixora kuakuensis 
Ixora kurziana

L 

Ixora labuanensis 
Ixora lacei 
Ixora lacuum 
Ixora lagenifructa 
Ixora lakshnakarae 
Ixora lancisepala 
Ixora laotica 
Ixora laurentii 
Ixora lawsonii 
Ixora laxiflora 
Ixora lebangharae 
Ixora lecardii 
Ixora ledermannii 
Ixora leptopus 
Ixora letestui 
Ixora leucocarpa 
Ixora leytensis 
Ixora liberiensis 
Ixora linggensis 
Ixora littoralis 
Ixora lobbii 
Ixora loerzingii 
Ixora longhanensis 
Ixora longibracteata 
Ixora longifolia 
Ixora longiloba 
Ixora longipedicellata 
Ixora longipedunculata 
Ixora longipes 
Ixora longistipula 
Ixora lucida 
Ixora lunutica 
Ixora luzoniensis

M 

Ixora macgregorii 
Ixora macilenta 
Ixora macrantha 
Ixora macrocotyla 
Ixora macrophylla 
Ixora macrosiphon 
Ixora macrothyrsa 
Ixora magnifica 
Ixora makassarica 
Ixora malabarica 
Ixora malacophylla 
Ixora malaica 
Ixora malayana 
Ixora mandalayensis 
Ixora mangabensis 
Ixora mangoliensis 
Ixora margaretae 
Ixora marquesensis 
Ixora marsdenii 
Ixora martinsii 
Ixora masoalensis 
Ixora maxima 
Ixora maymyensis 
Ixora mearnsii 
Ixora meeboldii 
Ixora megalophylla 
Ixora megalothyrsa 
Ixora mekongensis 
Ixora membranifolia 
Ixora mentangis 
Ixora mercaraica 
Ixora merguensis 
Ixora microphylla 
Ixora mildbraedii 
Ixora miliensis 
Ixora minahassae 
Ixora mindanaensis 
Ixora minor 
Ixora minutiflora 
Ixora miquelii 
Ixora mirabilis 
Ixora mjoebergii 
Ixora mocquerysii 
Ixora mollirama 
Ixora moluccana 
Ixora mooreensis 
Ixora moszkowskii 
Ixora motleyi 
Ixora mucronata 
Ixora muelleri 
Ixora myitkyinensis 
Ixora myriantha 
Ixora myrsinoides 
Ixora myrtifolia

N 

Ixora namatanaica 
Ixora nana 
Ixora nandarivatensis 
Ixora narcissodora 
Ixora natunensis 
Ixora nematopoda 
Ixora neocaledonica 
Ixora neriifolia 
Ixora nicaraguensis 
Ixora nicobarica 
Ixora nienkui 
Ixora nigerica 
Ixora nigricans 
Ixora nimbana 
Ixora nitens 
Ixora nitidula 
Ixora nonantha 
Ixora notoniana 
Ixora novemnervia 
Ixora novoguineensis

O 

Ixora oblongifolia 
Ixora obtusiloba 
Ixora odoratiflora 
Ixora oligantha 
Ixora ooumuensis 
Ixora opaca 
Ixora oreogena 
Ixora oresitropha 
Ixora orohenensis 
Ixora orophila 
Ixora orovilleae 
Ixora otophora 
Ixora ovalifolia

P 

Ixora palawanensis 
Ixora palembangensis 
Ixora pallens 
Ixora paludosa 
Ixora panurensis 
Ixora paradoxalis 
Ixora paraopaca 
Ixora parkeri 
Ixora parviflora 
Ixora patens 
Ixora patula 
Ixora pauciflora 
Ixora pauper 
Ixora pavetta 
Ixora peculiaris 
Ixora pedalis 
Ixora pedionoma 
Ixora pelagica 
Ixora pendula 
Ixora peruviana 
Ixora phellopus 
Ixora philippinensis 
Ixora phulangkaensis 
Ixora phuluangensis 
Ixora pierrei 
Ixora pilosa 
Ixora pilosostyla 
Ixora piresii 
Ixora platythyrsa 
Ixora polita 
Ixora polyantha 
Ixora polycephala 
Ixora potaroensis 
Ixora praestans 
Ixora praetermissa 
Ixora predeepii 
Ixora princeps 
Ixora prolixa 
Ixora pseudoacuminata 
Ixora pseudoamboinica 
Ixora pseudojavanica 
Ixora pubescens 
Ixora pubiflora 
Ixora pubifolia 
Ixora pubigera 
Ixora pubirama 
Ixora pudica 
Ixora pueuana 
Ixora pyrantha 
Ixora pyrrhostaura

Q 

Ixora quadrilocularis

R 

Ixora raiateensis 
Ixora raivavaensis 
Ixora rakotonasoloi 
Ixora rangonensis 
Ixora recurva 
Ixora reducta 
Ixora reticulata 
Ixora reynaldoi 
Ixora rhododactyla 
Ixora richard-longii 
Ixora richardiana 
Ixora ridsdalei 
Ixora riparum 
Ixora ripicola 
Ixora rivalis 
Ixora robinsonii 
Ixora roemeri 
Ixora romburghii 
Ixora rosacea 
Ixora roseituba 
Ixora rubrinervis 
Ixora rufa 
Ixora rugosirama 
Ixora rugulosa 
Ixora ruttenii

S 

Ixora sabangensis 
Ixora salicifolia 
Ixora salwenensis 
Ixora samarensis 
Ixora sambiranensis 
Ixora samoensis 
Ixora sandwithiana 
Ixora saulierei 
Ixora scandens 
Ixora scheffleri 
Ixora schlechteri 
Ixora schomburgkiana 
Ixora scortechinii 
Ixora seretii 
Ixora sessililimba 
Ixora setchellii 
Ixora siamensis 
Ixora siantanensis 
Ixora silagoensis 
Ixora simalurensis 
Ixora siphonantha 
Ixora sivarajiana 
Ixora smeruensis 
Ixora solomonensis 
Ixora solomonensium 
Ixora somosomaensis 
Ixora sparsiflora 
Ixora sparsifolia 
Ixora spathoidea 
Ixora spectabilis 
Ixora spirei 
Ixora spruceana 
Ixora st-johnii 
Ixora steenisii 
Ixora stenophylla 
Ixora stenothyrsa 
Ixora stenura 
Ixora stipulata 
Ixora stokesii 
Ixora storckii 
Ixora subauriculata 
Ixora subsessilis 
Ixora sulaensis 
Ixora sumbawensis 
Ixora symphorantha 
Ixora synactica 
Ixora syringiflora

T 

Ixora tahuataensis 
Ixora talaudensis 
Ixora tanzaniensis 
Ixora tavoyana 
Ixora temehaniensis 
Ixora temptans 
Ixora tenelliflora 
Ixora tengerensis 
Ixora tenuiflora 
Ixora tenuipedunculata 
Ixora tenuis 
Ixora thwaitesii 
Ixora tibetana 
Ixora tidorensis 
Ixora tigriomustax 
Ixora timorensis 
Ixora treubii 
Ixora triantha 
Ixora trichandra 
Ixora trichobotrys 
Ixora trichocalyx 
Ixora trilocularis 
Ixora trimera 
Ixora tsangii 
Ixora tubiflora 
Ixora tunicata

U 

Ixora uahukaensis 
Ixora uapouensis 
Ixora ulei 
Ixora umbellata 
Ixora umbricola 
Ixora undulata 
Ixora upolensis 
Ixora urophylla

V 

Ixora valetoniana 
Ixora vandersticheleorum 
Ixora vaughanii 
Ixora venezuelica 
Ixora venulosa 
Ixora versteegii 
Ixora verticillata 
Ixora vieillardii 
Ixora violacea 
Ixora vitiensis

W 

Ixora whitei 
Ixora winkleri 
Ixora woodii

Y 

Ixora yaouhensis 
Ixora yavitensis 
Ixora ysabellae 
Ixora yunckeri 
Ixora yunnanensis

Z 

Ixora zollingeriana 

Ixora